Cătălin Dragoș Teniță (born 4 October 1977, in Bucharest, Romania) is a Romanian politician serving as a member of the Romanian Parliament, Chamber of Deputies since December 2020. Before December 2020 he was a digital entrepreneur and civic activist. He was a founder of Treeworks, Zelist Monitor and Geeks for Democracy, a specialist in online communication and digital communities, and he was an Eisenhower Fellow 2020.

Political activity 
Cătălin Teniță is a member of the Romanian Parliament (Chamber of Deputies), being elected in the Bucharest electoral district, on the USR PLUS list in December 2020. He is Vice Leader of the USR PLUS parliamentary group in the Chamber of Deputies.

Committee assignments 
 Committee for Human Rights, National Minorities and Cults (Vice-chair)
 Chair Subcommittee for the Civic Society (Chair)
 Committee for Arts, Culture, and Media
 UNESCO Committee

Early life 
In 2000 he graduated from the Law School of the University of Bucharest.

Between 1995 and 1997 he was co-editor and translator at the Jurnalul SF, publishing over 100 materials (translations of short stories and novellas, as well as original book reviews), and a translator for various Romanian publishing houses. 

In the spring of 2002, together with two high school classmates, he founded TreeWorks – an I.T. company with its own programming and product development activities and has been the company's managing partner until the election as Romanian MP.

Civic involvement 
In the summer of 2016, he co-founded a civic affinity group called Geeks for Democracy, which became a non-profit association with legal personality in 2018. The purpose of this entity is to use the resources and know-how in the area of creative industries (I.T., communication, design) for civic actions.

Over time, Geeks for Democracy has carried out, either in its own name or in coalitions with other associations and groups, civic actions such as:

 Every Vote Matters is the platform for recruiting and training the voting observers (in cooperation with ExpertForum, Funky Citizens, CIVICA Iasi, Ghepart, Electoral Observatory)
 The Fund for Democracy – a donor community for civic startups and investigative journalism
 Crowdfunded national opinion polls on political opinions on current issues (February 2017 – OUG 13/2017, January 2018 – socio-economic/political correlations, December 2018 – opinion Romanians on pardoning/amnesty for corruption offenses in relation to those of common law)
 Our money – monitoring the public procurement in SEAP / SICAP
 AtlasElectoral.eu – analysis of election results and presence
 The Memorial of the Decree – a cross-media product of oral history type of the harmful consequences of Decree no. 770 of 1966 which established ruthless pronatalist policies
 Creative actions to support the protests caused by the attacks on justice during 2017-2019, both offline (Victoriei Square ) and online (statulparalel.ro, mitingucujapca.ro)
 New People in Politics – A Citizen Legislative Initiative to Reform Electoral Legislation to Simplify the Access of Competent Citizens in Politics
 Actions of public commemoration of the heroes of the Romanian Revolution on its 29th anniversary, respectively 30th anniversary (2019)
 Shopping at Your Door – an initiative to respond to the needs of the elderly or other risk categories in the COVID-19 crisis (a crowdsourced call-center and teams of volunteers for home delivery of food and medicine, as well as interventions of the mobile food bank in disadvantaged or quarantined communities).

In 2018 he participated in the course "Current U.S. Social, Political, and Economic Issues for Young European Leaders II", organized by the United States Department of State under the International Visitor Leadership Program.

In the fall of 2019 he was selected by Eisenhower Fellowships, Philadelphia as a Global Fellow 2020.

Recognition

Awards 

|-
! scope="row" | 2017
| Romanian PR Award
| non-profit campaign
| Every Vote Matters 
| 
|

|-
! scope="row" | 2017
| Civil Society Gala
| Civic Participation Category
| Every Vote Matters 
| 
|

|-
! scope="row" | 2018
| Civil Society Gala
| Civic Initiatives Category
| The Fund for Democracy
| 
|

Recognition and fellowships 

|-
! scope="row" | 2017
| CeRe  Public Participation Awards
| Special Award 
| Teniț@ and his Friends for Democracy
| 
|

|-
! scope="row" | 2017
| Romanian PR Awards
| Communicator of the Year
| Cătălin Teniță
| 
|

|-
! scope="row" | 2018
| U.S. State Department
| International Visitors Leadership Program
| Cătălin Teniță
| 
|

|-
! scope="row" | 2020
| Eisenhower Fellowships
| Global Fellow
| Cătălin Teniță
| 
|

Publications 

 Pierdut in timp (The Timeships, volume I) by Stephen Baxter, Nemira Publishing House, 1999, translated in Romanian by Cătălin Teniță
 Corabiile timpului (The Timeships, volume II) by Stephen Baxter, Nemira Publishing House, 2001, translated in Romanian by Cătălin Teniță
 I. L. Caragiale Virtual Encyclopedia - editors: Remus Cernea, Gabriela Bagrinovschi and Cătălin Teniță, published by  Noesis Cultural Society, Bucharest, 2002
 Constantin Brâncuși Virtual Encyclopedia - editors: Remus Cernea, Gabriela Bagrinovschi and Cătălin Teniță, published by  Noesis Cultural Society, Bucharest, 2003
 Nichita Stănescu Virtual Encyclopedia - editors: Remus Cernea, Gabriela Bagrinovschi and Cătălin Teniță, published by  Noesis Cultural Society, Bucharest, 2004
 "Searching the PR relevancy in the Social Media Age" published in The Golden Book of Romanian Public Relations, editor Dana Oancea, Forum for International Communications, Bucuresti, 2017, 
 "Cine sunt tefeliștii. Și de ce le este lor frica?" in Vă Vedem by Ramona Ursu, Humanitas Publishing House, 2018, 
 "Statul paralel al vrajitorilor, zeilor si sobolanilor" in Statul Paralel by Ramona Ursu, Editura Humanitas Publishing House, 2019, 
 "Povestind cu Ursula" in Scena 9, 2018, https://www.scena9.ro/article/povestind-cu-ursula
 The Step by step Revolution  in The Wilson Quarterly, Winter 2020 Issue: https://www.wilsonquarterly.com/quarterly/the-power-of-protest/the-step-by-step-revolution/

References

External links 
Online presence
 Official Page on Romanian Chamber of Deputies website
 Facebook Profil
 Linkedin Profil
 Personal blog
 Twitter Account
 Blog on Adevarul.ro platform
 Book reviews in Biz Magazine
GoodReads Profil

1977 births
Living people
Politicians from Bucharest
Romanian human rights activists
University of Bucharest alumni
Freedom, Unity and Solidarity Party politicians
Save Romania Union politicians
Members of the Chamber of Deputies (Romania)